Basidiopycnides is a genus of fungi in the Phleogenaceae family. The genus is monotypic, containing the single species Basidiopycnides albertensis. The species was isolated from bark beetles collected in Banff National Park.

References

External links

Atractiellales
Monotypic Basidiomycota genera
Taxa described in 2008
Fungi of North America